is a tactical role-playing game published by Sega for the Sega Saturn. It was the final entry in the  Shining series to be developed by Camelot Software Planning. Game data could be saved and transferred forward to later scenarios in order to influence events and obtain rewards in-game. Due to the imminent discontinuation of support for the Saturn outside Japan, Sega decided in advance to release Scenarios 2 and 3 only in Japan, so Scenario 1 was released in North America and Europe under the title Shining Force III with minor edits to the game script that resolved the original game's cliffhanger ending. Camelot issued a supplemental piece of software, Shining Force III Premium Disk, to Japanese players who submitted proofs of purchase for all three scenarios. The Premium Disk includes concept art, a character model viewer, and bonus battles to play with data imported from prior Shining Force III games.

Gameplay

Like earlier Force games in the Shining series, Shining Force III is a turn-based tactical role-playing game. Battles take place in square grids, and each unit occupies one square. Each unit can move up to a fixed amount of squares along the battlefield, determined by its Move statistic. Depending on its location relative to enemies and to allies, a unit can also perform one action: attack, cast a spell, use an item, or search the area. Some commands, such as equipping or dropping items, do not count as actions. The order of turns is determined by the unit's agility score and a random seed.

As is typical for an RPG, units become stronger by fighting enemies or by performing other actions in battle, such as healing allies. These actions give the units experience points (EXP), which allow them to gain levels.

Each character has a class, which defines a set of abilities for that unit and determines the spells and equipment they have access to. A character can be promoted to another class at any level between 10 or 20. Upon promotion the character's level resets to 1 and statistics are reduced by a fixed amount, although they begin higher if the character had been promoted at a higher level.

Battle goals for the player are fairly simple: kill all enemies, kill the enemies' leader, or advance to a town or landmark. The enemy side wins if they kill the player's leader (Synbios in Scenario 1, Prince Medion in Scenario 2 and Julian in Scenario 3), or if the player chooses to escape the battle by casting Return. Even if the player army is defeated, the player can recover allies and retry the battle. The Force keeps any experience that is obtained, regardless of the battle's outcome. Thus, there is no game over, and the player's army gets stronger even upon its defeat, although the leader's death results in the player losing half of their money.

Characters which fight together develop stronger friendships, which causes their battle stats to increase when the two characters are close to each other.

Shining Force III also possesses an exploration mode that occurs outside of battle. This gameplay mode is essentially a Japanese-style traditional RPG, along the lines of Final Fantasy or Dragon Quest, although there are no labyrinths and few puzzles to solve. In this mode, the player's army is represented by its leader, who is able to walk around, interact with people, find treasure, buy equipment and items, outfit the army and choose which of the army's members will be used in battle.

Plot
Scenario 1 features Synbios, a young lord from the Republic of Aspinia. Aspinia was once a part of the Empire of Destonia, but seceded after a war of independence spearheaded by some of the more democratic-minded nobles. They opposed Emperor Domaric's totalitarian policies, which disenfranchised a large number of people, creating a huge disparity between the wealthy and the poor. Tensions remained between Aspinia and Destonia after the secession, marked by occasional border disputes.

As the game begins, Synbios is part of a military force representing Aspinia at a peace conference in the neutral city of Saraband.  Due to manipulation by outside forces - later discovered to be connected with a religious cult known as the "Bulzome Sect" - full-scale war breaks out again between Aspinia and Destonia. The majority of the game's storyline covers this conflict as well as Synbios and his team's fight against the Bulzome sect. Throughout the game Synbios has periodic encounters with Medion, Destonia's youngest prince, who also recognizes the truth behind the war. Although on opposite sides of the war, the two work together to identify the real threat. Medion's role is portrayed in more detail in Scenario 2.

Scenario 2 features Medion, Prince of Destonia, and youngest of three sons of Emperor Domaric.  Although loyal to his father and his country, he senses that there are other forces at work beneath the tensions between Aspinia and Destonia.  He attends the conference in Saraband on behalf of Destonia, along with his brothers Arrawnt and Mageron.  As discovered in Scenario 1, much of this influence comes from the Bulzome sect, as well as collaborating separatist factions within both Destonia and Aspinia.  Medion works parallel to Synbios of Aspinia, often disposing of rogue Aspinian elements to spare Synbios's force from fighting against its own countrymen. At the end of the game, Medion is forced to battle with Synbios' force when Julian steps in to stop them.

Scenario 3 stars Julian, a mercenary who appears as a secondary character in both Scenario 1 and Scenario 2.  He is for all intents and purposes the true main character of Shining Force III. His initial motivation as the story begins is to track down and kill Galm, one of, if not the, most powerful member of the Vandals, a powerful race of beings that existed over 1,000 years ago. Julian believes that Galm killed his father and is seeking revenge. This story arc is first introduced in an earlier Shining game, Shining the Holy Ark, in which Julian appears as a young boy who asks the party to search for his missing father.

Julian joins Synbios in the midst of his quest in Scenario 1, but after an encounter with Galm, he is tossed over a waterfall at the suspension bridge and believed by Synbios' army to be dead. He reappears in Scenario 2, apparently washing ashore at the site of a battle between Medion's army and the Bulzome Sect. Knowing the sect's ties to the Vandals, Julian agrees to fight alongside Medion.  As it becomes clear that the sect is trying to kill Gracia, a child intended to become the next Innovator (A Shining Series figure equatable to a god), Julian takes on the task of protecting him and helping him realize his destiny.

Scenario 3 starts about 60% through scenario 2's story, and focuses primarily on battles against the Bulzome Sect and their allies in both Aspinia and Destonia. While scenarios 1 & 2 happen at roughly the same time, much of scenario 3 takes place after both, but there is some "overlap". Eventually Julian leads a three-party coalition consisting of the armies of both Synbios and Medion, to engage in the final conflict against Bulzome, a powerful Vandal long sealed in another dimension, and the true orchestrator of the conflict.

Development
The game was announced in August 1997.

Reception

Next Generation reviewed the game, rating it four stars out of five, and stated that "it's a worthy upgrade to a game series that's already proven itself." Next Generation reviewed the game again, rating it four stars out of five, and stated that "Like Saturn itself, Shining Force III will end up being an effort that was underproduced, underrated, but fun as hell."

Ashley Day of Retro Gamer magazine named it his favorite game of all time.

References

Notes

External links
Official site of Camelot Software Planning (Japanese)

Role-playing video games
Camelot Software Planning games
Episodic video games
Sega video games
Sega Saturn games
Sega Saturn-only games
Shining (series)
Strategy video games
Tactical role-playing video games
Video game sequels
Video games with isometric graphics
1997 video games
Video games scored by Motoi Sakuraba
Video games developed in Japan
Single-player video games